Bykovsky (masculine), Bykovskaya (feminine), or Bykovskoye (neuter) is the name of several rural localities in Russia:
Bykovsky, Rostov Oblast, a khutor in Nizhnebykovskoye Rural Settlement of Verkhnedonskoy District of Rostov Oblast
Bykovsky, Sakha Republic, a selo in Bykovsky Natsionalny Rural Okrug of Bulunsky District of the Sakha Republic
Bykovskaya, Kargopolsky District, Arkhangelsk Oblast, a village in Priozerny Selsoviet of Kargopolsky District of Arkhangelsk Oblast
Bykovskaya, Velsky District, Arkhangelsk Oblast, a village in Khozminsky Selsoviet of Velsky District of Arkhangelsk Oblast
Bykovskaya, Kirov Oblast, a village in Bolshevistsky Rural Okrug of Sunsky District of Kirov Oblast
Bykovskaya, Maryinsky Selsoviet, Vozhegodsky District, Vologda Oblast, a village in Maryinsky Selsoviet of Vozhegodsky District of Vologda Oblast
Bykovskaya, Mityukovsky Selsoviet, Vozhegodsky District, Vologda Oblast, a village in Mityukovsky Selsoviet of Vozhegodsky District of Vologda Oblast